Lunático is the second album by Gotan Project. It was released in 2006 by the Paris-based ¡Ya Basta! records, run by Philippe Cohen Solal.  The album is named Lunático after the racehorse of legendary tango master Carlos Gardel.

The album features a collaboration with the American band Calexico recorded in Tucson, Arizona, and a cover of the Ry Cooder song Paris, Texas. Recordings for the remainder of the album took place in Paris and Buenos Aires.

The first single off the album was "Diferente", the second single was "Mi Confesión". The third single was "La Vigüela".

Track listing
 "Amor Porteño" – 5:08
 "Notas" – 4:21
 "Diferente" – 5:23
 "Celos" – 5:31
 "Lunático" – 3:00
 "Mi Confesión" – 4:20
 "Tango Canción" – 4:23
 "La Vigüela" – 5:00
 "Criminal" – 3:35
 "Arrabal" – 3:58
 "Domingo" – 4:14
 "Paris, Texas" – 6:46

Personnel

Gotan Project:

Philippe Cohen Solal – bass, keyboards, sounds & dub fx. 
Eduardo Makaroff – acoustic guitar.
Christoph H. Müller – programming, bass, keyboards, speech synthesizer & fx.

Produced by: Christoph H. Müller, Eduardo Makaroff, Philippe Cohen. 
Mastering by Mandy Parnell @ Electric Mastering, London. 
Editing by Lionel Nicod @ Translab, Paris.

Paris recording sessions:

 Cristina Vilallonga – vocals
 Gustavo Beytelmann – piano
 Patrice Caratini – upright bass
 Nini Flores – bandoneon
 Line Kruse – violin
 Rudi Flores – acoustic guitar
 Nestor Marconi – bandoneon (track 2)
 Juan Carlos Caceres – spoken word (track 2)
 Minine Garay – percussion (track 12)
Recorded and mixed @ Substudioz by Christoph H. Müller, Eduardo Makaroff and Philippe Cohen Solal
 Cyril Atef – drums (on tracks 4, 5 and 7)
Recorded @ Studio EGP by Georges Petillot

– Tango quartet arranged by Gustavo Beytelmann.
 Gustavo Beytelmann – piano
 JuanJo Mosalini – bandoneon
 Roberto Tormo – upright bass
 Victor Villena – bandoneon
Recorded @ Studio Acousti by Manu Payet

Buenos Aires recording sessions:

 Featuring rap performed by Koxmoz (Apolo Novax and Chili Parker) (track 6)
 Spoken word performed by Jimi Santos (track 11)

– Strings arranged and conducted by Gustavo Beytelmann.
 Pablo Agri – violin soloist
 Elías Khayat – 1st violin
 Leonardo Ferreyra, Lázaro Beker, Pablo Borzani, Pablo Sangiorgio, Raúl di Renzo, Roberto Calomarde – violin
 Alexandre Jakovlev, Benjamín Bru Pesce, Eduardo-Felix Peroni – viola
 Jorge Pérez Tedesco, María Eugenia Castro – Cello
 Daniel Falasca – double bass
 Facundo Guevara – percussion
 Henry Richard Bay – trombone
Recorded @ Studio ION in March 2005.
Sound engineer: Jorge da Silva
Sound assistant: Ariel Lavigna
Pro Tools engineer: Javier Mazzarol

- Cafe Tortoni sounds on 'Celos' recorded by Emmanuelle Honorin

Calexico recording sessions (on Amor Porteño):

 Joey Burnes – vibes, upright bass, electric bass, electric guitar
 John Convertino – drums
Recorded @ Wavelab Studio, Tucson, Arizona by Chris Schultz

Music composed by:
Philippe Cohen Solal, Eduardo Makaroff and Christoph H. Müller except track 2 composed by Philippe Cohen Solal and Christoph H. Müller and track 12 composed by Ry Cooder

Lyrics by:
Eduardo Makaroff on tracks 1-4. 7 and 10, Lucas Lapalma and Diego Gaston Ponce on track 6, Gotan Project on track 11

Chart positions

Weekly

Year-end

Certifications

References 

2006 albums
Gotan Project albums
XL Recordings albums